Alfred Thangarajah Duraiappah (15 June 1926 – 27 July 1975) was a Sri Lankan Tamil lawyer, politician, Mayor of Jaffna and Member of Parliament.

Early life and family
Duraiappah was born on 15 June 1926. He was the son of an ice and aerated water manufacturer from Vannarpannai in northern Ceylon. He was educated at St. John's College, Jaffna. After school he joined Ceylon Law College, graduating as a proctor.

Duraiappah married Parameswary, daughter of Cumaraswamy. They had a daughter Rochana (Eesha). Duraiappah was a Christian.

Duraiappah's nephew Nishan Duraiappah is the chief of Peel Regional Police in Ontario, Canada.

Career
Duraiappah was elected to Jaffna Municipal Council and became its deputy mayor at the age of 23. He served as mayor from 1970 to 1975.

Duraiappah stood as an independent candidate in Jaffna at the March 1960 parliamentary election. He won the election and entered Parliament. He was re-elected at the July 1960 parliamentary election but lost out to the All Ceylon Tamil Congress candidate G. G. Ponnambalam at the 1965 parliamentary election. He tried to re-gain his seat at the 1970 parliamentary election but was defeated by the Illankai Tamil Arasu Kachchi candidate C. X. Martyn.

Duraiappah was a member of the governing Sri Lanka Freedom Party and its chief organiser in Jaffna District. Tamil militants considered Duraiappah to be a traitor and government collaborator. In February 1971 Tamil militant Pon Sivakumaran tried to assassinate Duraiappah by throwing a hand grenade on to Duraiappah's car which was parked on Second Cross Road in Jaffna. Duraiappah was not inside the car at the time.

Duraiappah was criticised for his handling of the 1974 Tamil conference incident in which 11 people were killed.

Assassination
On 27 July 1975 Duraiappah and his daughter Eesha went to the Varadaraja Perumal Temple (Maha Vishnu Temple) in Ponnalai for their weekly worship in the Peugeot 404 which had been given to Duraiappah by his supporters. As they arrived at the temple, Duraiappah was shot dead by masked men. Some members of his family believed that Posts and Telecommunications Minister Chelliah Kumarasuriar, Duraiappah's political rival, was behind the assassination. However, his assassination was widely blamed on the rebel Liberation Tigers of Tamil Eelam (LTTE) and its leader V. Prabhakaran. On 25 April 1978 the LTTE issued an open letter, which was published in the Virakesari, claiming responsibility for the assassination of eleven people including Duraiappah.

The Duraiappah Stadium in Jaffna was named after him.

Further reading

References

External links

1926 births
1975 deaths
Alumni of Ceylon Law College
Alumni of St. John's College, Jaffna
Assassinated mayors
Assassinated Sri Lankan politicians
Ceylonese proctors
Mayors of Jaffna
Members of the 4th Parliament of Ceylon
Members of the 5th Parliament of Ceylon
People from British Ceylon
Sri Lanka Freedom Party politicians
Sri Lankan Christians
Sri Lankan Tamil lawyers
Sri Lankan Tamil politicians
Sri Lankan terrorism victims
Terrorism deaths in Sri Lanka